Marc Labrèche  (born November 20, 1960 in Montreal, Quebec) is a Canadian actor, comedian and host.

Background
The son of Quebec comedian Gaetan Labrèche, Marc Labrèche had an interest in stage acting from his childhood. His career began in live theatre, but Labrèche's television career started in 1980 when he performed in several television shows and soap-operas including his first TV role in Claude Jasmin's Boogie-woogie 47. His first appearance in a movie was in 1987 when he appeared in If Only.

In total, Labrèche has appeared in more than 30 movies and TV series, including Matusalem, Ding et Dong, La Petite Vie, Machine Gun Molly (Monica la mitraille), L'Odysée d'Alice Tremblay and Les Bougon. Labrèche had a leading role in Days of Darkness (L'Âge des ténèbres) directed by Denys Arcand. Labrèche has also performed in the French versions of Toy Story and Toy Story II as Slinky, and on The Simpsons as Krusty the Clown since 1994. Labrèche also hosted the TQS humor show, La Fin du monde est à 7 heures from 1997 to 2000, and wrote and hosted the talk show Le Grand Blond avec un show sournois that aired from 2000 until 2003 on TVA. Since 2006, he has hosted Le Fric Show, a late-night consumer show on SRC.

In 2005 Labrèche's wife Fabienne Dor, daughter of the singer George Dor and mother of his two children, died of cancer. Labrèche was deeply shaken by her death, having taken a brief hiatus from his career to care for her, and has worked with the Canadian Cancer Society several times to help raise awareness of the disease.

In February 2015, Labrèche revealed that he was in a relationship with Jennifer Tremblay, a costume designer for the shows 30 Vies and Ruptures.

In autumn 2016 Labrèche  returned to television after a three-year hiatus with the show Info, sexe et mensonges, and will also be appearing in the Bye Bye (a satirical end-of-year show) for 2016. In the same year, he directed a segment of the collective film 9 (9, le film).

Awards
Labrèche has received several Gemini Awards nominations and awards including for best supporting male interpreter/actor in La Petite Vie in 1993, best host for humour and variety shows in 2000 and 2001, and best male comedy lead in 2006. He also won a Metro Star award in 2002 for best male personality.

Filmography

Movies
 If Only - 1997
 In the Belly of the Dragon (Dans le ventre du dragon) - 1989
 Ding et Dong - 1990
 Four Stiffs and a Trombone (L'assassin jouait du trombone) - 1991
 Matusalem - 1993
 Streetheart (Le Cœur au poing) - 1996
 Matusalem II (Matusalem 2: le dernier des Beauchesne) - 1997
 The Revenge of the Woman in Black (La vengeance de la femme en noir) - 1997
 Slippery Ice - 1999
 The Little Story of a Man Without a Story (La petite histoire d'un homme sans histoire) - 1999
 Alice's Odyssey (L'Odyssée d'Alice Tremblay) - 2002
 Machine Gun Molly (Monica la mitraille) - 2004
 The United States of Albert (Les États-Unis d'Albert) - 2006
 Days of Darkness (L'Âge des ténèbres) - 2007
 The Child Prodigy (L'Enfant Prodige) - 2010
 Whitewash - 2013
 9 (9, le film) - 2016
 The Other Side of November (L'Autre côté de novembre) - 2016
 Felix and the Treasure of Morgäa (Félix et le trésor de Morgäa) - 2021

Voice roles (TV and movies)
 Histoire de Jouets (Toy Story) - Slinky (1995)
 La Petite Sirene (The Little Mermaid) - Hippocampe (1998)
 Les Simpson (The Simpsons) - Krusty the Clown (1994–2007)
 Détestable Moi (Despicable Me) - Gru (2010)
 Toopy and Binoo French version (Toopy and Binoo)
 Le Grincheux (The Grinch) - Grinch (2018)

Television series
 Boogie-woogie 47 (1980)
 Chop Suey (1986)
 Qui a tiré sur nos histoires d'amour? (1986)
 Le grand remous (1989)
 La Petite vie (1993–1999)
 Les Intrépides (1993)
 Les Bougon (2004)
 Le coeur a ses raisons (2007)
 Les Bobos (2012)

Host
 La fin du monde est à 7 heures (1997–2000)
 Le Grand Blond avec un show sournois (2000–2003)
 Le Fric Show (2006–2007)
 3600 secondes d'extase (2008–2011)
 1800 secondes d'extase (2011–2012)

References

External links
 
 Genealogy : Marc Labrèche

1960 births
Canadian male film actors
Canadian male stage actors
Canadian male television actors
Canadian male voice actors
Comedians from Montreal
Film directors from Montreal
French Quebecers
Living people
Male actors from Montreal
Members of the Order of Canada
People from Saint-Lambert, Quebec